The 1950 season is the Crvena zvezda 5th season in the existence of the club. The team played in the Yugoslav Basketball League.

Overview

Players

Squad information

Depth chart

Players In

Players Out

Competitions

Overall

Overview

Yugoslav Federal League

League table

Source: Yugoslav First Basketball League Archive

Regular season

Source: KK Crvena zvezda History

Statistics

References

External links
 KK Crvena zvezda official website 

KK Crvena Zvezda seasons
Crvena zvezda